The 1950 Texas A&M Aggies football team represented Texas A&M University in the 1950 college football season as a member of the Southwest Conference (SWC). The Aggies were led by head coach Harry Stiteler in his third season and finished with a record of seven wins and four losses (7–4 overall, 3–3 in the SWC) and with a victory over Georgia in the Presidential Cup Bowl.

Schedule

References

Texas AandM Aggies
Texas A&M Aggies football seasons
Texas AandM Aggies football